Cambodia competed in the 2009 Southeast Asian Games athletics tournament, winning three gold medals and 40 medals in total.

Preparations 
Cambodia only announced the formation of its National Team Organizing Committee for the SEA Games in mid-October 2009, less than two months ahead of the start of the Games in Vientiane, Laos. The National Olympic Committee of Cambodia (NOCC) assigned its Vice President Bun Sok to chair this committee.

This committee was made up of representatives of various Olympic sports federations and was responsible for final screening and selection of athletes to represent Cambodia in various sports. Cambodia was to compete in 17 sports, with expectations of medals in pétanque, athletics, tennis, wrestling, boxing, taekwondo and beach volleyball. As part of the preparation for 2009 SEA Games, the athletics and taekwondo athletes traveled to South Korea to undergo intensive training courtesy of the Incheon City of Korea Support Program, while other athletes were to complete training in Vietnam.

The Phnom Penh Post reported that, according to Nhan Sokvisal, the SEA Games coordinator, Cambodia was looking forward and optimistic to better their medals haul from the last SEA Games in Thailand in 2007. In the 2007 Games, Cambodia won 19 metals - two gold, five silver and 12 bronze.

Cambodian Prime Minister Hun Sen confirmed his presence at the Opening Ceremony after Laotian Prime Minister Bouasone Bouphavanh's visit to Cambodia in late November.

Medalists

References 

2009
Southeast Asian Games
Nations at the 2009 Southeast Asian Games